These species belong to the genus Hypothenemus, oriental bark beetles.

Hypothenemus species

 Hypothenemus aberrans Browne, 1973
 Hypothenemus abhorrens Wood, 2007
 Hypothenemus abruptus (Schedl, 1961)
 Hypothenemus acaciae (Eggers, 1920)
 Hypothenemus adscitus (Schedl, 1950)
 Hypothenemus adustus Bright, 2019
 Hypothenemus aethiops (Schedl, 1965)
 Hypothenemus africanus (Hopkins, 1915)
 Hypothenemus agnatus (Eggers, 1924)
 Hypothenemus alternatus (Eggers, 1943)
 Hypothenemus amakusanus (Murayama, 1934)
 Hypothenemus amplissimus Bright & Torres, 2006
 Hypothenemus apicalis Wood, 1974
 Hypothenemus areccae (Hornung, 1842)
 Hypothenemus artocarpi Browne, 1978
 Hypothenemus arundinis (Eichhoff, 1878)
 Hypothenemus ascitus Wood, 1971
 Hypothenemus ater Eggers, 1932
 Hypothenemus aterrimulus Wood, 1989
 Hypothenemus aterrimus (Schedl, 1951)
 Hypothenemus atomus Hopkins, 1915
 Hypothenemus atratus (Schedl, 1964)
 Hypothenemus attenuatus (Eggers, 1935)
 Hypothenemus aulmanni Hagedorn, 1912
 Hypothenemus avitus Bright & Poinar, 1994
 Hypothenemus balachowskyi Menier, 1971
 Hypothenemus baloghi (Schedl, 1967)
 Hypothenemus bambusae Browne, 1980
 Hypothenemus barinensis Wood, 2007
 Hypothenemus bauhaniae (Schedl, 1950)
 Hypothenemus bezaziani Peyerimhoff, 1935
 Hypothenemus bicinctus Schedl, 1959
 Hypothenemus bidens Browne, 1973
 Hypothenemus bifurcatus Bright, 2019
 Hypothenemus birmanus (Eichhoff, 1878)
 Hypothenemus biseriatus (Eggers, 1919)
 Hypothenemus bolivianus (Eggers, 1931)
 Hypothenemus brevicollis (Eggers, 1927)
 Hypothenemus brevis Eggers, 1932
 Hypothenemus californicus Hopkins, 1915
 Hypothenemus camerunus (Eggers, 1922)
 Hypothenemus carbonarius Eggers, 1943
 Hypothenemus carinafrons Bright, 2019
 Hypothenemus colae (Schedl, 1957)
 Hypothenemus collinus Bright, 2019
 Hypothenemus columbi Hopkins, 1915
 Hypothenemus concolor Hagedorn, 1909
 Hypothenemus costatus (Eichhoff, 1878)
 Hypothenemus crinatus Bright, 2019
 Hypothenemus criticus (Schedl, 1937)
 Hypothenemus crudiae (Panzer, 1791)
 Hypothenemus cryphaloides (Eichhoff, 1878)
 Hypothenemus cuneolus (Schedl, 1936)
 Hypothenemus curtipennis (Schedl, 1950)
 Hypothenemus cylindraceus Schedl, 1972
 Hypothenemus cynometrae Schedl, 1957
 Hypothenemus delicatus Schedl, 1964
 Hypothenemus deprecator (Schedl, 1941)
 Hypothenemus dexter (Sampson, 1922)
 Hypothenemus dimorphus (Schedl, 1959)
 Hypothenemus dipterocarpi Hopkins, 1915
 Hypothenemus discordis Bright, 2019
 Hypothenemus dissimilis (Zimmermann, 1868)
 Hypothenemus distinctus Wood, 1954
 Hypothenemus dolichocola Hopkins, 1915
 Hypothenemus donisi (Schedl, 1957)
 Hypothenemus dorsosignatus (Schedl, 1950)
 Hypothenemus dubitalis Bright, 2019
 Hypothenemus ebenus Wood, 2007
 Hypothenemus elephas (Eichhoff, 1872)
 Hypothenemus emmi (Hagedorn, 1913)
 Hypothenemus erectus LeConte, 1876
 Hypothenemus eruditus (Westwood, 1834)
 Hypothenemus euphorbiae (Schedl, 1961)
 Hypothenemus exceptus Bright, 2019
 Hypothenemus exiguus (Wood, 1986)
 Hypothenemus eximius Schedl, 1951
 Hypothenemus externedentatus Schedl, 1959
 Hypothenemus flavus Hopkins, 1915
 Hypothenemus fuscicollis (Eichhoff, 1878)
 Hypothenemus georgiae (Hopkins, 1915)
 Hypothenemus glabratulus (Schedl, 1957)
 Hypothenemus glabripennis (Hopkins, 1915)
 Hypothenemus gossypii (Hopkins, 1915)
 Hypothenemus grandis Schedl, 1939
 Hypothenemus granulatus Bright, 2019
 Hypothenemus hampei (Ferrari, 1867)
 Hypothenemus hirsutus (Wood, 1954)
 Hypothenemus hystrix (Eggers, 1919)
 Hypothenemus ignotus Bright, 2019
 Hypothenemus improvidus Bright, 2019
 Hypothenemus incognitus (Schedl, 1967)
 Hypothenemus indigens Wood, 1974
 Hypothenemus indigenus Bright & Peck, 1998
 Hypothenemus indistinctus Bright, 2019
 Hypothenemus ingens Schedl, 1942
 Hypothenemus inordinatus Bright, 2019
 Hypothenemus insulanus Bright, 2002
 Hypothenemus interstitialis (Hopkins, 1915)
 Hypothenemus intricatus (Schedl, 1950)
 Hypothenemus japonicus (Niisima, 1910)
 Hypothenemus javanus (Eggers, 1908)
 Hypothenemus kamathi Beaver, 1995
 Hypothenemus kraunhiae Murayama, 1950
 Hypothenemus lefevrei (Schedl, 1952)
 Hypothenemus leprieuri (Perris, 1866)
 Hypothenemus leptosquamus Bright, 2019
 Hypothenemus liberiensis (Hopkins, 1915)
 Hypothenemus liliputianus Bright, 2019
 Hypothenemus lineatus (Eggers, 1927)
 Hypothenemus longipennis (Eggers, 1935)
 Hypothenemus longipilis Schedl, 1952
 Hypothenemus loranthus (Schedl, 1942)
 Hypothenemus macrolobii (Eggers, 1940)
 Hypothenemus madagascariensis Schedl, 1953
 Hypothenemus magnus (Eggers, 1924)
 Hypothenemus major Browne, 1970
 Hypothenemus malayensis (Schedl, 1977)
 Hypothenemus mallyi (Hopkins, 1915)
 Hypothenemus malus (Schedl, 1957)
 Hypothenemus mangovorus Schedl, 1961
 Hypothenemus marginatus Johnson, 2020
 Hypothenemus marshalli (Eggers, 1936)
 Hypothenemus mateui (Schedl, 1965)
 Hypothenemus melanarius (Schedl, 1953)
 Hypothenemus melasomus (Lea, 1910)
 Hypothenemus meridensis Wood, 2007
 Hypothenemus miles (LeConte, 1878)
 Hypothenemus minor (Eggers, 1927)
 Hypothenemus modestus (Murayama, 1940)
 Hypothenemus morigerus (Schedl, 1957)
 Hypothenemus morio (Eggers, 1940)
 Hypothenemus morosus Schedl, 1965
 Hypothenemus mozambiquensis Eggers, 1943
 Hypothenemus mulongensis (Eggers, 1940)
 Hypothenemus multidentatulus (Schedl, 1962)
 Hypothenemus multidentatus (Hopkins, 1915)
 Hypothenemus multipunctatus (Schedl, 1939)
 Hypothenemus muticus (Schedl, 1961)
 Hypothenemus namosianus Browne, 1983
 Hypothenemus nanellus Wood, 1971
 Hypothenemus nanoparvus Bright, 2019
 Hypothenemus natalensis (Schedl, 1941)
 Hypothenemus nesiotus Bright, 2019
 Hypothenemus nigropiceus (Schedl, 1951)
 Hypothenemus novateutonicus (Schedl, 1951)
 Hypothenemus obscurifrons Bright, 2019
 Hypothenemus obscurus (Fabricius, 1801)
 Hypothenemus opacus (Eichhoff, 1872)
 Hypothenemus paradoxus Schedl, 1964
 Hypothenemus parallelus (Hopkins, 1915)
 Hypothenemus parasquamosus Bright, 2019
 Hypothenemus parvulosus Bright, 2019
 Hypothenemus parvulus Browne, 1984
 Hypothenemus paulus Bright, 2019
 Hypothenemus perappositus (Schedl, 1934)
 Hypothenemus perexiguus Bright, 2019
 Hypothenemus perhispidus (Eggers, 1927)
 Hypothenemus perpunctatus (Eggers, 1940)
 Hypothenemus piaparolinae Johnson, Atkinson & Hulcr, 2016
 Hypothenemus pilosus Hopkins, 1915
 Hypothenemus ponticus Bright, 2019
 Hypothenemus praecellens (Schedl, 1972)
 Hypothenemus pubescens Hopkins, 1915
 Hypothenemus pubipennis (Eggers, 1935)
 Hypothenemus puertoricensis (Bright & Torres, 2006)
 Hypothenemus pullus (Wood, 1971)
 Hypothenemus pygmaeomorphus Bright, 2019
 Hypothenemus rotundicollis (Eichhoff, 1878)
 Hypothenemus rubrithorax Bright, 2019
 Hypothenemus ruficeps Perkins, 1900
 Hypothenemus rugifer (Schedl, 1965)
 Hypothenemus ruginosus Wood, 1989
 Hypothenemus rugosipes Wood, 2007
 Hypothenemus sambesianus Eggers, 1943
 Hypothenemus sapporoensis (Niisima, 1910)
 Hypothenemus sassaensis (Eggers, 1924)
 Hypothenemus schedli Browne, 1963
 Hypothenemus scutiae (Schedl, 1959)
 Hypothenemus seoulensis Choo & Woo, 1989
 Hypothenemus seriatus (Eichhoff, 1872)
 Hypothenemus setiferous Bright, 2019
 Hypothenemus setosus (Eichhoff, 1868)
 Hypothenemus simoni (Reitter, 1887)
 Hypothenemus sobrinus (Schedl, 1965)
 Hypothenemus socialis (Schedl, 1957)
 Hypothenemus solitarius (Schedl, 1950)
 Hypothenemus solivagus Bright, 2019
 Hypothenemus solocis Wood, 1974
 Hypothenemus sparsedentatus (Schedl, 1942)
 Hypothenemus sparsus Hopkins, 1915
 Hypothenemus spinatus (Schedl, 1977)
 Hypothenemus spinicollis (Schedl, 1965)
 Hypothenemus spinosus (Schedl, 1979)
 Hypothenemus squamosulus Johnson, 2020
 Hypothenemus squamosus (Hopkins, 1915)
 Hypothenemus stigmosus (Schedl, 1951)
 Hypothenemus striatus (Atkinson, 1993)
 Hypothenemus styrax (Schedl, 1942)
 Hypothenemus subacuminatus (Schedl, 1942)
 Hypothenemus subterrestris Johnson, Atkinson & Hulcr, 2016
 Hypothenemus suspectus Wood, 1974
 Hypothenemus tectus Bright, 2019
 Hypothenemus teretis Wood, 1971
 Hypothenemus teteforti (Menier, 1971)
 Hypothenemus tredli (Reitter, 1908)
 Hypothenemus tristis (Eichhoff, 1876)
 Hypothenemus trivialis Wood, 1974
 Hypothenemus tuberosus (Schedl, 1942)
 Hypothenemus turnbowi Bright, 2019
 Hypothenemus ustulatus Bright, 2019
 Hypothenemus vernaculus Bright, 2019
 Hypothenemus versicolor Bright, 2019
 Hypothenemus vesculus Wood, 1974
 Hypothenemus villosus Bright, 2019
 Hypothenemus virolae Wood, 2007
 Hypothenemus vitis Browne, 1970
 Hypothenemus winkleri (Reitter, 1907)
 Hypothenemus woodi Bright, 2019
 Hypothenemus xanthophloeae (Schedl, 1957)

References

Scolytinae
Hypothenemus